Dennis Avoth (born 25 October 1947) is a retired Egypt-born heavyweight boxer. Avoth was a promising amateur boxer who turned professional in 1967. He held the Welsh Heavyweight Championship title from 1971 to 1973. He is the brother of Eddie Avoth, who was also a boxer and who became British, and Commonwealth Light-heavyweight champion, and European Light-heavyweight challenger.

Boxing career
Avoth boxed out of the Victoria Park boxing club as a youth, and whilst still a teenager, he won the Welsh Amateur Boxing Association title, beating Del Phillips, who at 6 ft 5ins was seven inches taller than Avoth. The Welsh title allowed Avoth to enter the European championships, but was forced to retire after a torn rib ligament.

Avoth turned professional in 1967 and like Eddie Avoth, his older brother before him, he joined the stable of Merthyr based trainer, Eddie Thomas. Avoth's first professional bout was against London-based fighter Doyley Brown at Grosvenor House in Mayfair, an undercard to a Ken Buchanan match. Avoth stopped his opponent via technical knockout in the fifth of the six round fight. This was the first in a string of seven unbeaten fights, including a victory over Paul Brown at the National Sporting Club in January 1968. Despite this promising start, his allusions of following his brother as a major contender were broken by four straight loses.

Avoth was back to winning ways in the first half of 1969, remaining unbeaten in six fights, though all were through points decision. His run was broken in May when he faced future British heavyweight champion Bunny Johnson at the Midlands Sporting Club in Solihull. The eight round fight went the full distance, with the bout being awarded to Johnson. This was followed by a draw against his amateur title opponent Del Phillips, before Avoth again faced a future British heavyweight champion, Danny McAlinden. The fight against McAlinden was part of a national heavyweight competition held in Mayfair, London for a prize of £1,000. The eight-man knockout contest was scheduled for three rounds per bout and Avoth faced Manchester-based fighter Obe Hepburn in the quarter finals. After beating Hepburn on points, he then beat Billy Wynter by the same decision in the semi-final. The other semi-final was between McAlinden and another future champion, Richard Dunn. McAlinden knocked out Dunn in the first round, and then managed to stop Avoth in the final again in the first round, but this time via technical knockout. Avoth fought once more in 1969, a loss to Central Area champion, Billy Aird, before readjusting his sights on a new challenge, the Welsh heavyweight title, held by North Walian Carl Gizzi.

1970 began with mixed results for Avoth. He lost to Charlie White, a fighter he had faced four times previously as a professional, before he recorded a win over Terry Feeley at the National Sporting Club. He then lost to Cliff Field before a Wales heavyweight title eliminator with Del Phillips was arranged. The fight was arranged as the top billing at Swansea's Top Rank Suite on 22 June 1970. The night started poorly for the Avoth family when younger brother Leslie was beaten by Santos Martins on the undercard, and Avoth's ambitions to become Welsh heavyweight were dented after Phillips was given the decision by referee Adrian Morgan after the match went the full ten rounds. Avoth finished 1970 with another two losses; to Peter Boddington in London and then to Bunny Johnson in Aberavon, both on points decision.

In 1971, and now managed by his father Jack, Avoth got his shot at the Welsh heavyweight title, which was still held by Carl Gizzi and had now been undefended in the six years since Gizzi won the title. The title fight was taken out of Wales and was staged at the National Sporting Club in London. The fight went the full ten rounds and Avoth was given the decision, making him the new Wales heavyweight champion. 1971 ended with two more wins, over Guinea Roger and Brian Jewitt; but 1972 began with two loses, which included the first time he had ever lost a professional fight by knockout when Roger Tighe stopped him in the sixth round of an eight-round contest. In April 1972, Avoth defended his Welsh title for the first time when he again faced Del Phillips. The two met in Swansea and again the fight went the distance, but this time referee Adrian Morgan gave the fight to Avoth. Avoth defended his title just once more when he beat Gene Innocent in Swansea in June 1973. Avoth was to fight just once more, a home bout in Sophia Gardens Pavilion in his home town of Cardiff. His challenger, Phil Matthew, knocked Avoth out in the first round, and Avoth retired from the sport soon after.

Professional boxing record

|-
|align="center" colspan=8|22 Wins (4 knockouts, 18 decisions), 20 Losses (6 knockouts, 14 decisions), 3 Draws 
|-
|align="center" style="border-style: none none solid solid; background: #e3e3e3"|Result
|align="center" style="border-style: none none solid solid; background: #e3e3e3"|Record
|align="center" style="border-style: none none solid solid; background: #e3e3e3"|Opponent
|align="center" style="border-style: none none solid solid; background: #e3e3e3"|Type
|align="center" style="border-style: none none solid solid; background: #e3e3e3"|Round
|align="center" style="border-style: none none solid solid; background: #e3e3e3"|Date
|align="center" style="border-style: none none solid solid; background: #e3e3e3"|Location
|align="center" style="border-style: none none solid solid; background: #e3e3e3"|Notes
|-align=center
|Loss
|
|align=left| Phil Matthews
|KO
|1
|1 August 1973
|align=left| Sophia Gardens Pavilion, Cardiff, United Kingdom
|align=left|
|-
|Win
|
|align=left| Gene Innocent
|PTS
|10
|27 June 1973
|align=left| Top Rank Suite, Swansea, United Kingdom
|align=left|
|-
|Loss
|
|align=left| Eddie Neilson
|PTS
|8
|30 April 1973
|align=left| National Sporting Club, Piccadilly, London, United Kingdom
|align=left|
|-
|Loss
|
|align=left| Tim "Fire" Wood
|PTS
|8
|19 April 1973
|align=left| Wolverhampton Civic Hall, Wolverhampton, United Kingdom
|align=left|
|-
|Win
|
|align=left| Guinea Roger
|PTS
|8
|5 February 1973
|align=left| Top Rank Suite, Swansea, United Kingdom
|align=left|
|-
|Loss
|
|align=left| Eddie Nielson
|PTS
|8
|27 November 1972
|align=left| National Sporting Club, Piccadilly, London, United Kingdom
|align=left|
|-
|Loss
|
|align=left| Frank "The Tank" Carpenter
|PTS
|8
|24 October 1972
|align=left| Bull Ring Sporting Club, Birmingham, United Kingdom
|align=left|
|-
|Loss
|
|align=left| Frank "The Tank" Carpenter
|PTS
|8
|27 June 1972
|align=left| Villa Park, Birmingham, United Kingdom
|align=left|
|-
|Win
|
|align=left| Del Phillips
|PTS
|10
|24 April 1972
|align=left| Swansea Cwmfelin, Swansea, United Kingdom
|align=left|
|-
|Loss
|
|align=left| Les "Is More" Stevens
|TKO
|6
|27 March 1972
|align=left| Top Rank Suite, Reading, United Kingdom
|align=left|
|-
|Loss
|
|align=left| Roger Tighe
|KO
|6
|14 February 1972
|align=left| National Sporting Club, Piccadilly, London, United Kingdom
|align=left|
|-
|Win
|
|align=left| Brian Jewitt
|PTS
|8
|29 November 1971
|align=left| West of England Sporting Club, Bristol, United Kingdom
|align=left|
|-
|Win
|
|align=left| Guinea Roger
|TKO
|5
|9 November 1971
|align=left| Wolverhampton, United Kingdom
|align=left|
|-
|Win
|
|align=left| Carl Gizzi
|PTS
|10
|11 October 1971
|align=left| Cafe Royal, Piccadilly, London, United Kingdom
|align=left|
|-
|Win
|
|align=left| Bunny Johnson
|PTS
|8
|22 September 1971
|align=left| Midlands Sporting Club, Solihull, United Kingdom
|align=left|
|-
|Win
|
|align=left| Brian "City" Hall
|PTS
|6
|5 July 1971
|align=left| Grosvenor House, Mayfair, London, United Kingdom
|align=left|
|-
|Loss
|
|align=left| Bunny Johnson
|PTS
|10
|19 October 1970
|align=left| Aberavon, United Kingdom
|align=left|
|-
|Loss
|
|align=left| Peter Boddington
|PTS
|8
|8 September 1970
|align=left| Empire Pool, Wembley, London, United Kingdom
|align=left|
|-
|Loss
|
|align=left| Del Phillips
|PTS
|10
|22 June 1970
|align=left| Swansea, United Kingdom
|align=left|
|-
|Loss
|
|align=left| Cliff Field
|TKO
|7
|9 March 1970
|align=left| Centre Hotel, Bloomsbury, London, United Kingdom
|align=left|
|-
|Win
|
|align=left| Terry Feeley
|TKO
|4
|10 February 1970
|align=left| National Sporting Club, Piccadilly, London, United Kingdom
|align=left|
|-
|Loss
|
|align=left| Charlie "Wizzer" White
|PTS
|8
|12 January 1970
|align=left| Mayfair Sporting Club, Mayfair, London, United Kingdom
|align=left|
|-
|Loss
|
|align=left| Billy Aird
|PTS
|6
|29 September 1969
|align=left| National Sporting Club, Piccadilly, London, United Kingdom
|align=left|
|-
|Loss
|
|align=left| Danny McAlinden
|TKO
|1
|7 July 1969
|align=left| Mayfair, London, United Kingdom
|align=left|
|-
|Win
|
|align=left| Billy Wynter
|PTS
|3
|7 July 1969
|align=left| Mayfair, London, United Kingdom
|align=left|
|-
|Win
|
|align=left| Obe Hepburn
|PTS
|3
|7 July 1969
|align=left| Mayfair, London, United Kingdom
|align=left|
|-
|Draw
|
|align=left| Del Phillips
|PTS
|8
|2 July 1969
|align=left| Cardiff, United Kingdom
|align=left|
|-
|Loss
|
|align=left| Bunny Johnson
|PTS
|8
|7 May 1969
|align=left| Midlands Sporting Club, Solihull, United Kingdom
|align=left|
|-
|Win
|
|align=left| Jack Cotes
|PTS
|6
|28 April 1969
|align=left| Grosvenor House, Mayfair, London, United Kingdom
|align=left|
|-
|Win
|
|align=left| George Dulaire
|PTS
|6
|24 March 1969
|align=left| National Sporting Club, Mayfair, London, United Kingdom
|align=left|
|-
|Win
|
|align=left| Jack Cotes
|PTS
|6
|10 March 1969
|align=left| Colston Hall, Bristol, United Kingdom
|align=left|
|-
|Draw
|
|align=left| Obe Hepburn
|PTS
|8
|24 February 1969
|align=left| National Sporting Club, Piccadilly, London, United Kingdom
|align=left|
|-
|Win
|
|align=left| George Dulaire
|PTS
|8
|3 February 1969
|align=left| Cafe Royal, Piccadilly, London, United Kingdom
|align=left|
|-
|Win
|
|align=left| Charlie "Wizzer" White
|PTS
|8
|23 January 1969
|align=left| Dunstable, United Kingdom
|align=left|
|-
|Loss
|
|align=left| Charlie "Wizzer" White
|PTS
|6
|27 November 1968
|align=left| Sophia Gardens Cricket Ground, Cardiff, United Kingdom
|align=left|
|-
|Loss
|
|align=left| "Crown" Vic Moore
|TKO
|7
|12 May 1968
|align=left| Grosvenor House, Mayfair, London, United Kingdom
|align=left|
|-
|Loss
|
|align=left| Terry Daly
|PTS
|6
|9 April 1968
|align=left| Empire Pool, Wembley, London, United Kingdom
|align=left|
|-
|Loss
|
|align=left| Charlie "Wizzer" White
|PTS
|8
|27 February 1968
|align=left| Drill Hall, Northampton, United Kingdom
|align=left|
|-
|Win
|
|align=left| Terry Feeley
|PTS
|6
|12 February 1968
|align=left| Grosvenor House, Mayfair, London, United Kingdom
|align=left|
|-
|Win
|
|align=left| Paul "Cleveland" Brown
|PTS
|8
|22 January 1968
|align=left| National Sporting Club, Piccadilly, London, United Kingdom
|align=left|
|-
|Win
|
|align=left| Charlie "Wizzer" White
|PTS
|6
|11 December 1967
|align=left| Raynors Sporting Club, Leicester, United Kingdom
|align=left|
|-
|Win
|
|align=left| "Boxing" Bert Johnson
|PTS
|6
|28 November 1967
|align=left| Afan Lido, Aberavon, United Kingdom
|align=left|
|-
|Win
|
|align=left| Paul "Cleveland" Brown
|TKO
|5
|22 October 1967
|align=left| Hotel Metropole Sporting Club, Brighton, United Kingdom
|align=left|
|-
|Win
|
|align=left| Barry Rodney
|PTS
|6
|9 October 1967
|align=left| Raynors Sporting Club]], Leicester, United Kingdom
|align=left|
|-
|Win
|
|align=left| Doyley Brown
|TKO
|5
|14 September 1967
|align=left| Grosvenor House, Mayfair, London, United Kingdom
|align=left|
|}

References

Bibliography

External links
 

1947 births
Living people
Welsh male boxers
Heavyweight boxers
Boxers from Cardiff
Egyptian emigrants to the United Kingdom